Mark Fisher (3 December 1959 – 12 December 2016) was a British session keyboardist. He was the first keyboard player for Wham! and performed on their 1985-1986 world tour.  He also worked with Sister Sledge, and was one-half of Matt Bianco. 
His father is Tony Fisher, a trumpeter who worked with Frank Sinatra, Sarah Vaughan, and Oscar Peterson, and recorded with The Beatles during the Sgt. Pepper's Lonely Hearts Club Band sessions, appearing on "Strawberry Fields Forever".

References

1959 births
2016 deaths
British rock keyboardists
British session musicians